Juan López Hita (5 September 1944 – 11 June 2014) was a Spanish professional footballer who played most of his career in Sevilla FC. He also appeared in three matches of the national team.

References

1944 births
2014 deaths
Footballers from Algeciras
Spanish footballers
La Liga players
Segunda División players
Algeciras CF footballers
Sevilla FC players
Association football defenders
Spain international footballers